Walter Edward Rogers (July 19, 1908 – May 31, 2001) was a Democratic United States Representative from Texas.

He was born in Texarkana, Arkansas in 1908. He received his law degree from the University of Texas in 1935 and became the city attorney for Pampa, Texas three years later.

Rogers was elected to Congress in 1950 and served until he retired in 1967. He was one of five Texas congressmen to sign the Southern Manifesto in 1956, a resolution in protest against the United States Supreme Court decision in Brown v. Board of Education. Rogers was the only member of the combined House of Representatives or Senate to vote against honorary citizenship for Winston Churchill in 1963. On November 22, 1963, Rogers was in the motorcade in Dallas when President Kennedy was assassinated, though four cars back.

The congressman died on May 31, 2001 in Naples, Florida, at the age of 92.

References

Biographical Directory of the United States Congress: ROGERS, Walter Edward.

1908 births
2001 deaths
People from Texarkana, Arkansas
Democratic Party members of the United States House of Representatives from Texas
20th-century American politicians